A wide area network (WAN) is a telecommunications network that extends over a large geographic area. Wide area networks are often established with leased telecommunication circuits.

Businesses, as well as schools and government entities, use wide area networks to relay data to staff, students, clients, buyers and suppliers from various locations around the world. In essence, this mode of telecommunication allows a business to effectively carry out its daily function regardless of location. The Internet may be considered a WAN. Many WANs are, however, built for one particular organization and are private. WANs can be separated from local area networks (LANs) in that the latter refers to physically proximal networks.

Design options
The textbook definition of a WAN is a computer network spanning regions, countries, or even the world. However, in terms of the application of communication protocols and concepts, it may be best to view WANs as computer networking technologies used to transmit data over long distances, and between different networks. This distinction stems from the fact that common local area network (LAN) technologies operating at lower layers of the OSI model (such as the forms of Ethernet or Wi-Fi) are often designed for physically proximal networks, and thus cannot transmit data over tens, hundreds, or even thousands of miles or kilometres.

WANs are used to connect LANs and other types of networks together so that users and computers in one location can communicate with users and computers in other locations. Many WANs are built for one particular organization and are private. Others, built by Internet service providers, provide connections from an organization's LAN to the Internet. 

WANs are often built using leased lines. At each end of the leased line, a router connects the LAN on one side with a second router within the LAN on the other. Because leased lines can be very expensive, instead of using leased lines, WANs can also be built using less costly circuit switching or packet switching methods. Network protocols including TCP/IP deliver transport and addressing functions. Protocols including Packet over SONET/SDH, Multiprotocol Label Switching (MPLS), Asynchronous Transfer Mode (ATM) and Frame Relay are often used by service providers to deliver the links that are used in WANs. 

Academic research into wide area networks can be broken down into three areas: mathematical models, network emulation, and network simulation. 

Performance improvements are sometimes delivered via wide area file services or WAN optimization.

Private networks
Of the approximately four billion addresses defined in IPv4, about 18 million addresses in three ranges are reserved for use in private networks. Packets addressed in these ranges are not routable on the public Internet; they are ignored by all public routers. Therefore, private hosts cannot directly communicate with public networks, but require network address translation at a routing gateway for this purpose.

{| class="wikitable"
|+ Reserved private IPv4 network ranges
|-
!Name!!CIDR block!!Address range!!Number of addresses!!Obsolete classful description
|-
|24-bit block||10.0.0.0/8||10.0.0.0 – 10.255.255.255||align="right"|||Single Class A.                         
|-
|20-bit block|||172.16.0.0/12||172.16.0.0 – 172.31.255.255||align="right"|||Contiguous range of 16 Class B blocks.  
|-
|16-bit block||192.168.0.0/16||192.168.0.0 – 192.168.255.255||align="right"|||Contiguous range of 256 Class C blocks. 
|}

Since two private networks, e.g., two branch offices, cannot directly communicate via the public Internet, the two networks must be bridged across the Internet via a virtual private network (VPN) or other form of IP tunnel that encapsulates packets, including their headers containing the private addresses, for transmission across the public network. Additionally, encapsulated packets may be encrypted to secure their data.

Connection technology
Many technologies are available for wide area network links. Examples include circuit-switched telephone lines, radio wave transmission, and optical fiber. New developments have successively increased transmission rates. In ca. 1960, a  line was normal on the edge of the WAN, while core links of 56 or 64 kbit/s were considered fast. Today, households are connected to the Internet with dial-up, asymmetric digital subscriber line (ADSL), cable, WiMAX, cellular network or fiber. The speeds that people can currently use range from 28.8 kbit/s through a 28K modem over a telephone connection to speeds as high as 100 Gbit/s using 100 Gigabit Ethernet.

The following communication and networking technologies have been used to implement WANs.

 Asynchronous Transfer Mode
 Cable modem
 Dial-up internet
 Digital subscriber line
 Fiber-optic communication
 Frame Relay
 ISDN
 Leased line
 SD-WAN
 Synchronous optical networking
 X.25

AT&T conducted trials in 2017 for business use of 400-gigabit Ethernet. Researchers Robert Maher, Alex Alvarado, Domaniç Lavery, and Polina Bayvel of University College London were able to increase networking speeds to 1.125 terabits per second. Christos Santis, graduate student Scott Steger, Amnon Yariv, Martin and Eileen Summerfield developed a new laser that potentially quadruples transfer speeds with fiber optics.

See also

Cell relay
Internet area network (IAN)
Label switching
Low-power wide-area network (LPWAN)
Wide area application services
Wireless WAN

References

External links 
Cisco - Introduction to WAN Technologies

 What is a software-defined wide area network?

Wide area networks
Telecommunications
Data transmission